The parliamentary committees of the United Kingdom are committees of the Parliament of the United Kingdom. Each consists of a small number of Members of Parliament from the House of Commons, or peers from the House of Lords, or a mix of both, appointed to deal with particular areas or issues; most are made up of members of the Commons. The majority of parliamentary committees are select committees. The remit of these committees vary depending on whether they are committees of the House of Commons or the House of Lords.

House of Commons

Select committees

Select committees in the Commons are designed to oversee the work of departments and agencies, examine topical issues affecting the country or individual regions or nations, and review and advise on the procedures, workings and rules of the House.

Departmental select committees are designed to oversee and examine the work of individual government departments and any related departmental bodies and agencies.
Topical select committees examine topical issues of importance.
Internal select committees have responsibility with respect to the day-to-day running of Parliament.

General Committees
 Public bill committees (formerly known as Standing Committees on Bills)
 Delegated Legislation Committees
 European Committees
 Northern Ireland Grand Committee
 Regional Affairs Committee
 Scottish Grand Committee
 Welsh Grand Committee

Others
 Advisory Committee on Works of Art
 House of Commons Commission
 Administration Estimate Audit Committee
 Members Estimate Committee
 Members Estimate Audit Committee
 Public Accounts Commission
 Speaker's Committee on the Electoral Commission
 Speaker's Committee for the Independent Parliamentary Standards Authority

House of Lords

The House of Lords appoint Sessional select committees to examine and explore general issues such as the constitution or the economy; the European Union Committee scrutinises EU action via its sub-committees; each session Special Inquiry committees are appointed to examine specific issues.

Sessional
 Communications and Digital Committee
 Constitution Committee
 International Agreements Committee
 International Relations and Defence Committee
 Science and Technology Committee
 Economic Affairs Committee
 Finance Bill Sub-Committee
 European Union Committee
 Environment Sub-Committee
 Goods Sub-Committee
 Security & Justice Sub-Committee
 Services Sub-Committee

Special Inquiry (2019–21 Session) 
 Electoral Registration and Administration Act 2013 Select Committee
 Food, Poverty, Health & the Environment Select Committee
 Social and Economic Impact of Gambling Select Committee
 Democracy & Digital Technologies Select Committee

Legislative 
 Delegated Powers and Regulatory Reform Select Committee (DPRRC)
 Secondary Legislation Scrutiny Committee (SLSC) 
 Hybrid Instruments Committee

Internal
 House of Lords Commission
 Finance Committee
 Liaison Committee
 Conduct Committee
 Procedure and Privileges Committee
 Committee of Selection

Domestic
 Services Committee

Joint house committees

Joint Committees are committees formed to examine a particular issue, whose membership is from both the Commons and the Lords.
 Joint Committee on Consolidation Bills
 Ecclesiastical Committee
 Joint Committee on the National Security Strategy
 Joint Committee on Human Rights
 Intelligence and Security Committee of Parliament
 Joint Committee on Statutory Instruments
 Joint Committee on Tax Law Rewrite Bills
 Joint Committee on the Palace of Westminster

Former committees
Occasionally, committees will be discharged. This occurs when existing committees are no longer required or have their responsibilities transferred to a different committee, effectively rendering the original committee void. It is more common, however, for committees to be discharged as a result of the abolition of government departments, for example the abolition of the Department of Education and Skills in June 2007 resulted in the abolition of the Education and Skills Select Committee shortly afterwards.

Commons

Departmental
Agriculture Select Committee - dissolved in 2001, and replaced by the Environment, Food and Rural Affairs Select Committee following the replacement of the Ministry of Agriculture, Food and Fisheries with the Department for Environment, Food and Rural Affairs
Business and Enterprise Select Committee - dissolved 30 September 2009, and replaced by the Business, Innovation and Skills Select Committee following the replacement of the Department for Business, Enterprise and Regulatory Reform with the Department for Business, Innovation and Skills
Constitutional Affairs Select Committee - dissolved 25 July 2007, and replaced by the Justice Select Committee following the replacement of the Department for Constitutional Affairs with the Ministry of Justice.
Education and Employment Select Committee - split in 2001 into the Education and Skills Select Committee and the Work and Pensions Select Committee following the splitting of the Department for Education and Employment into two distinct departments.
Education and Skills Select Committee - dissolved 25 July 2007, and replaced with the Children, Schools and Families Select Committee and the Innovation, Universities, Science and Skills Select Committee following the replacement of the Department of Education and Skills with the Department for Children, Schools and Families and the Department for Innovation, Universities and Skills.
Energy and Climate Change Select Committee - abolished after the Department for Energy and Climate Change was merged into the new Department for Business, Energy and Industrial Strategy in July 2016.
Environment, Transport and Regional Affairs Select Committee - abolished in 2001, with the environment portion of the committee's remit being transferred to the Environment, Food and Rural Affairs Select Committee and the remainder being transferred to the new Transport, Local Government and the Regions Select Committee following changes to several government departments following the 2001 general election.
Innovation, Universities, Science and Skills Select Committee - dissolved 30 September 2009 following the abolition of the Department for Innovation, Universities and Skills. Technically replaced by the Science and Technology Select Committee.
Lord Chancellor's Department Committee – abolished in 2003 following the merging of the Lord Chancellor's Department into the Department for Constitutional Affairs
Committee on the Office of the Deputy Prime Minister – abolished in 2006 and replaced with the Communities and Local Government Select Committee following the abolition of the Office of the Deputy Prime Minister, which was replaced by the Department for Communities and Local Government
Political and Constitutional Reform Select Committee – created in 2010 to scrutinise the work of Nick Clegg, the Deputy Prime Minister, who had responsibility for political and constitutional reform in the coalition government. On 3 June 2015 it was merged with the Public Administration Select Committee to form the Public Administration and Constitutional Affairs Select Committee.
Public Administration Select Committee – merged with the Political and Constitutional Reform Select Committee on 3 June 2015 to form the Public Administration and Constitutional Affairs Select Committee.
Science and Technology Committee – abolished in 2007 following the creation of the Innovation, Universities, Science and Skills Select Committee
Social Security Select Committee – abolished in 2001 and replaced with the Work and Pensions Select Committee following the replacement of the Department of Social Security with the Department for Work and Pensions
Trade and Industry Select Committee - dissolved 25 July 2007, and replaced with the Business and Enterprise Select Committee following the replacement of the Department of Trade and Industry with the Department for Business, Enterprise and Regulatory Reform.
Transport, Local Government and the Regions Select Committee – abolished after less than one year and replaced by the Office of the Deputy Prime Minister Select Committee and the Transport Select Committee

Domestic
All five domestic committees were abolished in 2005 and replaced by a single committee – the Administration Committee.
 Accommodation and Works Committee
 Administration Committee
 Broadcasting Committee
 Catering Committee
 Information Committee

Internal
 Select Committee on the Modernisation of the House of Commons (examined how Commons practices and procedures could be modernised)

Legislative
 Legislative grand committees

Regional
The House of Commons set up eight regional select committees in November 2008, whose members were first appointed on 3 March 2009. The committees were formed of five Labour members, as opposed to the nine members from various parties as was agreed in the original motion, due to the refusal of the Conservatives and Liberal Democrats to nominate any members as a sign of their opposition to setting up the committees. The resolution that formed the committees expired at the end of the 2005/10 Parliament. The succeeding coalition government of Conservatives and Liberal Democrats chose not to renew it.
East of England Regional Select Committee
East Midlands Regional Select Committee
North East Regional Select Committee
North West Regional Select Committee
South East Regional Select Committee
South West Regional Select Committee
West Midlands Regional Select Committee
Yorkshire and the Humber Regional Select Committee

Lords

Topical
 Barnett Formula Select Committee
 House of Lords Select Committee on Monetary Policy Committee of the Bank of England
 Intergovernmental Organisations Select Committee
 Select Committee on Regulators

Internal
 House Committee (replaced by House of Lords Commission)
 Privileges and Conduct Committee (split into Conduct Committee and Procedure and Privileges Committee)

Domestic
 Administration and Works Committee (replaced by Services Committee)
 Information Committee (replaced by Services Committee)
 Refreshment Committee (replaced by Services Committee)
 House of Lords Offices Committee

Joint
 Joint Committee on House of Lords Reform
 Joint Committee of Tax Simplification

References

External links
Committees of the UK Parliament
Former Select Committees

 
Committees of the British House of Commons
Committees of the House of Lords
Committees